Pasteur was a French Navy  of the M6 ​​series commissioned in 1932. She participated in World War II until she was scuttled in June 1940.

Characteristics

Pasteur was part of a fairly homogeneous series of 31 deep-sea patrol submarines also called "1,500-tonners" because of their displacement. All entered service between 1931 and 1939.

They displaced  on the surface and  underwater. When submerged, their two electric motors produced a combined  and allowed them to reach .

Construction and commissioning

Laid down at Arsenal de Brest in Brest, France, on 5 July 1926 with the hull number Q139, Pasteur was launched on 19 August 1928. She was commissioned on 1 September 1932.

Service history

On 12 May 1936, Pasteur and the destroyer  collided at the mouth of the Gironde during an exercise of the 2nd Light Squadron.

In 1937, Pasteur received orders to make an endurance cruise to Douala, French Cameroon, in company with her sister ship .

World War II

At the start of World War II in September 1939, Pasteur was assigned to the 2nd Submarine Division in the 4th Submarine Squadron in the 1st Flotilla, a component of the Forces de haute mer (High Seas Force), based at Brest. Her sister ships Achille, and  made up the rest of the division.

On either 3 or 14 September 1939, according to different sources, the four submarines of the 2nd Submarine Division as well as their sister ships  and  received orders to establish a standing patrol off the coast of Spain. The six submarines spent six weeks patrolling off Vigo, where part of the German merchant fleet — which the Allies suspected of serving as supply ships for German U-boats — had taken refuge at the start of the war. One source specifies that Pasteur, Casabianca, and Sfax rotated on patrol off Vigo beginning on 1 October 1939. Before their patrols ended on 30 or 31 October 1939, according to different sources, the six French submarines had spent a combined 67 days at sea on patrol in very harsh conditions with no results.

On 14 November 1939, the 2nd Submarine Division received orders to proceed to Halifex, Nova Scotia, Canada, to take part in Allied convoy operations in the Atlantic Ocean. During the winter of 1939–1940, the submarines  escorted three convoys from Halifax to the United Kingdom always in difficult weather conditions.

Beginning on 22 March 1940, the division was based at Harwich on the North Sea coast of England. On 17 April 1940, the division moved to Dundee, Scotland, to operate in the North Sea in support of Allied forces fighting in the Norwegian campaign as German forces began their conquest of Norway. While departing Dundee for her first Norwegian patrol on 18 April 1940, Pasteur collided with Achille, suffering damage to one of her diving planes and one of her propeller shafts. She was towed first to Cherbourg, France, and then to Brest for repairs, arriving there under tow by the tug Abeille 4 on 15 June 1940.

German ground forces advanced into France on 10 May 1940, beginning the Battle of France, and Italy declared war on France on 10 June 1940 and joined the invasion. Pasteur was unable to move under her own power as German forces approached Brest. To prevent the Germans from capturing her, she was scuttled at Brest at 19:00 on 18 June 1940. The Germans later refloated her wreck to clear the berth.

References

Citations

Bibliography

 
 
 
 

Redoutable-class submarines (1928)
1928 ships
Ships built in France
World War II submarines of France
Maritime incidents in 1936
Maritime incidents in April 1940
Maritime incidents in June 1940
Shipwrecks of France
Scuttled vessels
Lost submarines of France